"C'est la Vie" is a song by French DJ and record producer Martin Solveig. The song was released in the France as a digital download on 21 January 2008. It was released as the lead single from his third studio album C'est la Vie (2008). The song was written and produced by Martin Solveig. The song has charted in Belgium, Spain and Switzerland.

Track listing

Chart performance

Weekly charts

Release history

References

2008 singles
2008 songs
Franglais songs
Martin Solveig songs
Songs written by Martin Solveig
Universal Music Group singles